Chink was the nickname of some athletes or military figures, predominantly American in the early 20th century. It is often adjudged to be a reference to someone's appearance. The nickname is an ethnic slur originally referring to a person of Chinese descent. However, not all uses of the nickname were derived in that manner: basketball player Chink Crossin received the nickname as an onomatopoeia for the sound that chain basketball nets (sometimes used on outdoor basketball courts) make when a shot goes through (similar to the term "swish" used for cloth nets), and British Army officer Eric Dorman-Smith was given the nickname due to his resemblance to a Chinkara antelope. Notable persons with the nickname include:

 Chink Alterman (1922–2009), American professional basketball player
 Chink Crossin (1923–1981), American professional basketball player
 Eric Dorman-Smith (1895–1969), Irish officer in the British Army and the Irish Republican Army
 John Heileman (1872–1940), American Major League Baseball player in 1901
 Bankson T. Holcomb Jr. (1908–2000), United States Marine Corps brigadier general
 William O. Lowe (1894–1949), American college football player, lawyer, and Republican political figure in Tennessee
 Chink Outen (1905–1961), American Major League Baseball player in 1933
 Chink Taylor (1898–1980), American Major League Baseball player in 1925
 Albert Zachary (1914–2006), American Major League Baseball pitcher in 1944

See also
 Chink Martin (1886–1981), stage name of American jazz tuba player Martin Abraham
 Chink Santana (born 1972), stage name of American R&B musician and producer Andre Parker
 Chinki Yadav (born 1997), Indian sport shooter

Lists of people by nickname